The women's 5000 metres T54 event at the 2016 Summer Paralympics took place at the Rio Olympic Stadium on 14 and 15 September. It featured 14 athletes from 8 countries and was open to both T54 and T53 classification athletes. The United States took all three medals, while eventual winner Tatyana McFadden broke the Paralympic record during the heat stages.

The T54 category is for athletes with paraplegia, but have normal hand and arm function, limited to no trunk function, and no leg function. T53 athletes may have spinal injuries or cerebral palsy and have full use of their arms but have no or limited trunk function.

Records 
The existing world records were as follows.

Heats 
The heats were completed at 10:00 and 10:17 local time. The first three athletes in each heat and the next four fastest advanced to the final.

Heat 1

Heat 2

Final

References 

Women's